The ABC 1600 was a personal computer from Luxor that was introduced in 1985. It was built around the Motorola 68008 processor, had  of memory and used the operating system ABCenix, a Unix-like system developed from DNIX.

The hard disk had a capacity of 13 MB and the 5.25-inch floppy disk drive stored .

See also 
 ABC 80
 ABC 800

References

External links
 Photo – ABC 1600
 Details – ABC 1600

68k-based computers
Personal computers
UNIX System V